South Carolina Highway 183 (SC 183) is a  state highway that travels from Westminster to Greenville.

Route description
SC 183 begins at an intersection with U.S. Route 76 (US 76) and US 123 in Westminster. It travels north to Walhalla and then east to meet SC 130 for a short concurrency on Rochester Highway near the Oconee Nuclear Station at Lake Keowee in Seneca in Oconee County. The road, known as East Pickens Highway, moves east by northeast over a tributary that feeds into Lake Hartwell where the road name changes to Walhalla Highway as the highway enters Pickens County,  eastward. SC 183 moves  where it intersects Six Mile Road, the northern terminus of SC 137. Traveling east by northeast on Walhalla Highway, SC 183 goes  before reaching downtown Pickens, the county seat. The highway travels  where it intersects SC 8. Traveling concurrently with SC 8 for  northeastward on Jewel Road, SC 183 splits off from SC 8 to become Farrs Bridge Road. SC 183 moves  where it intersects SC 135 at Dacusville Road. It then moves eastward  where it intersects US 25 in Greenville County, crossing over the Saluda River in the process. Once SC 183 passes West Parker Road, the road names changes to Cedar Lane Road, then travels an additional  to reach West Blue Ridge Drive at SC 253. Then, it continues to the southeast and reaches its eastern terminus, an intersection with US 29 (Church Street).

Major intersections

See also

References

External links

SC 183 at Virginia Highways' South Carolina Highways Annex

183
Transportation in Oconee County, South Carolina
Transportation in Pickens County, South Carolina
Transportation in Greenville County, South Carolina